Four ships of the Royal Navy have borne the name HMS Latona, after the Romanised name of the character Leto, of Greek mythology:

 was a 38-gun fifth rate launched in 1781. She was used for harbour service from 1813 and was sold in 1816.
 was a 46-gun fifth rate launched in 1821, put up for sale in 1869 and broken up by 1875.
 was an  protected cruiser launched in 1890. She was used as minelayer in 1907 and was sold in 1920.
 was an  launched in 1940 and sunk in 1941.

Royal Navy ship names